Hagoromo Bungu was a Japanese office supply and chalk company. It is best known for having produced the Hagoromo Fulltouch Chalk, a brand of blackboard chalk. Though mainly sold in Japan and South Korea, the chalk came to be used worldwide for its alleged ease of use. Nonetheless, general decline in chalk sales among other factors led to its shuttering in 2015. The announcement of the company's closing led fans to stockpile its chalk. South Korean company Sejongmall eventually bought the Hagoromo brand and much of the original company's equipment and has manufactured the chalk in South Korea since 2016.

History 
The company was founded in October 1932 as Nihon Chalk Seizosho. The original factory was located in Naka-ku, Nagoya, but was destroyed in August 1944 during World War II. The company was re-established in 1947 and renamed to Hagoromo Bungu. A factory in the nearby city of Kasugai was completed in 1961, and the offices moved there in 1992.

Success 

The company sold over 90 million pieces of chalk a year at its peak in 1990 and held a 30% share of the domestic market, according to Tokyo Shoko Research.

Mathematician Satyan Devadoss wrote in 2010 that the Hagoromo chalk can be called "the Michael Jordan of chalk, the Rolls-Royce of chalk". Several other well-known mathematicians and professors, such as Brian Conrad and David Eisenbud, also prefer the product. Eisenbud first introduced the chalk to American mathematicians and worked to have it imported to the US; it is now sold on Amazon.

Closing 
In October 2014, company president Takayasu Watanabe released a statement announcing the company would stop chalk production in February 2015 and sales in March 2015. Watanabe, Ryuzo Watanabe's successor, mentioned reasons for the closure included the fact that "blackboards are no longer the norm in classrooms" and that "the number of students is also on the wane". In a 2015 interview, Watanabe also cited his declining health as a major reason for the closure.

Final months 
The announcement to cease business led to the mass buying, hoarding, and reselling of chalk among its fanbase.

By June 2015, Watanabe reported that production continued for a month longer than originally planned and finally ended on 31 March 2015.

Legacy 
Hagoromo sold the three custom-made machines used for making Hagoromo chalk. Umajirushi, a Japanese blackboard manufacturer looking to expand their chalk production, bought one. Umajirushi has since launched DC Chalk Deluxe.

Sejongmall, a retailer in South Korea who previously imported the Hagoromo chalk, bought the other two machines and the rights to the Hagoromo brand and continue to produce the chalk in South Korea. Mathematicians consider it indistinguishable from the original product.

Products 
The Hagoromo Fulltouch Chalk product line is what the company is most known for.  The entire line is marketed as being "dustless".

 Fulltouch Chalk: calcium chalk
 Fulltouch Large Chalk: calcium chalk, 2 cm in diameter and 11.3 cm in length, available in white, red, orange, yellow, green, and blue
 Fulltouch New Poly: gypsum chalk, sometimes known as plaster chalk
 Fulltouch Luminous Color Chalk: gypsum chalk

References

External links 

 

Office supply companies of Japan
Defunct manufacturing companies of Japan
Chalk